"Blue Gangsta" is a song by American recording artist Michael Jackson. The song is the 7th track of Jackson's second posthumous album Xscape. The song was originally written, composed and produced by Jackson with music by Dr. Freeze during the Invincible album recording session in 1998. The song was re-tooled by Timbaland and Jerome "J-Roc" Harmon during the recording session in 2013–14 of the Xscape album.

Background and leak
The song was originally recorded in 1998 for the Invincible album but failed to make the final cut. Dr. Freeze re-tooled the song without changing the original music to fit night clubs but this version was not featured on the Xscape album.

Opening with a movie score-like wash of strings and the urgent refrain, “What cha gonna do/You ain’t no friend of mine/Look what you put me through/Now that I’m the blue gangsta,” the Timbaland-produced tune features a spare, skittering beat and Jackson singing over the multi-tracked chorus. Brazilian tribute artist and impersonator Rodrigo Teaser revealed in a podcast that LaVelle Smith Jr. (Jackson's long-time personal friend, choreographer and dancer), who had worked with Teaser, told him that the song would be the last part of a gangster-themed trilogy to be presented in live performances, the two previous parts being Smooth Criminal and Dangerous.

Release
The song was released on MTV on May 8, 2014

Music video
Published on 14 May 2014 to Michael Jackson's VEVO. Inspired by the short film for Jackson's short video for Smooth Criminal, dancers from Michael Jackson: The Immortal World Tour celebrated the release of Xscape with a music video choreographed to this single. A shortened edit of the 2010 leaked version was used to celebrate the original version of this song.

Critical reception
Jon Blistein from Rolling Stone Said that "The harrowing, hard-hitting 'Blue Gangsta' features a fiery vocal performance from Jackson, as well as updated production from Timbaland, who gives the track his signature futuristic spin, complete with snap-back snares, eerie low-end synths, blaring horns and striking strings."

Gil Kaufman from MTV Said that "If 'Thriller' gave you the chills, wait til you get a shot of Michael Jackson's 'Blue Gangsta.' The song, which is available exclusively now at michaeljackson.mtv.com will appear on the upcoming posthumous King of Pop album, Xscape, and it is a classic slice of cinematic MJ pop magic."

Charts

See also
 List of unreleased Michael Jackson material
 Death of Michael Jackson

References

1998 songs
Michael Jackson songs
Song recordings produced by Michael Jackson
Song recordings produced by Timbaland
Song recordings produced by Jerome "J-Roc" Harmon
Songs released posthumously
Songs written by Michael Jackson
Songs written by Dr. Freeze
Song recordings produced by Dr. Freeze